The Handley Page H.P.42 and H.P.45 were four-engine biplane airliners designed and manufactured by British aviation company Handley Page, based in Radlett, Hertfordshire. It held the distinction of being the largest airliner in regular use in the world upon the type's introduction in 1931.

The H.P.42/45 were designed in response to a specification issued during 1928 by British airline Imperial Airways; the two models share considerable similarities, the H.P.42 being optimised towards greater range at the expense of payload while the H.P.45 had these priorities inverted, allowing the latter to carry more passengers over shorter distances. Imperial Airways approved of Handley Page's proposals and ordered four aircraft of the two variants to serve as the new land-based long-distance flagships of its fleet.

On 14 November 1930, the prototype, named Hannibal, conducted its maiden flight. Following their introduction into Imperial Airways, they formed the backbone of the airliner's land-based fleet through most of the 1930s and, along with the company's numerous flying boats, have been considered to be icons of their era. A total of eight aircraft were built, four of each type; all were named, with names beginning with the letter "H". Three of the survivors were pressed into Royal Air Force (RAF) service at the outbreak of the Second World War. By the end of 1940, all of the aircraft had been destroyed as a result of several accidents.

Development 

Work on what would become the H.P.42 was initiated in response to a specification released by British airline Imperial Airways in 1928, which sought a large airliner to operate upon its major routes, including its long distance ones to various parts of the globe. British aircraft manufacturer Handley Page, who had already established a pedigree for developing and constructing above-average sized aircraft, saw the Imperial Airways opportunity as quite attractive and thus embarked on producing their own designs to fulfil it.

Handley Page ultimately designed two largely similar aircraft, designated H.P.42 and H.P.45 respectively, to meet different requirements: The H.P.42 was meant to serve Imperial Airways' long-range Eastern routes, while the H.P.45 had been configured to serve their shorter routes across Europe. Imperial Airways, having been suitably impressed by Handley Page's submissions, decided to order four of each variant for its passenger fleet. In Imperial Airways service, the H.P.42 was commonly referred to as the H.P.42E (E for "Eastern" routes – India and South Africa), while the H.P.45 was the H.P.42W (W for "Western" i.e. European routes). The H.P.42 and H.P.45 designations were internally assigned by Handley Page, thus the HP.45 identifier was not commonly used during the flying lives of the aircraft.

Several efforts have been mooted to produce additional H.P.42s for heritage/preservation purposes.
During 2015, a fundraising campaign was launched with the aim of producing a replica of the H.P.42.
As there are no surviving examples, a replica must be somewhat original in construction, although authentic blueprints and other source material from the era is available for use in its construction. While it is planned for the replica to be built to an airworthy condition, various safety regulations would prevent the carriage of paying passengers.

Design 
The Handley Page H.P.42 was a large unequal-span sesquiplane. It was a relatively unorthodox aircraft, even beyond its size, having incorporated numerous original features throughout its design. As observed in an official evaluation by the American National Advisory Committee for Aeronautics (NACA), amongst the uncommon elements included is a fuselage which extended more forwards beyond its wings than that of most contemporary aircraft. It used an all-metal approach in its construction, except for a few areas such as the fabric coverings present on the wings, tail surfaces and rear fuselage. The fuselage comprises two sections, the forward section being a metal monocoque and the rear formed from welded steel tubes; their construction was noted as seemingly quite strong, but also relatively expensive.

The wings were braced by a Warren truss. Automatic slots are fitted to the top wing, the auxiliary airfoils of which benefiting from a new construction approach involving single z-section spars and planking, both composed of duralumin. Slot-type ailerons are also present, each being installed upon four hinges and supported by four box-section brackets; these ailerons are both statically and aerodynamically balanced, making them relatively light to control. Inboard of the lower engines, the lower wings slope upwards to pass above the fuselage rather than through it, thus keeping the spars from obstructing potential cabin space. Both the elevators and ailerons are controlled via a large diameter Y-tube; the core controls being duplicated. The tailplane was of a biplane configuration, being furnished with three separate fins.

Both models placed their engines in the same positions: two engines on the upper wing and one on each side of the fuselage on the lower wing; while this arrangement was uncommon, it was not an original innovation, having been previously used on aircraft produced by Blériot. The upper engines are placed as close together as permissible by the diameter of their propellers. The engines are mounted on rigid duralumin plates that are attached to rear wing spar via welded steel tubing; fuel for the engines is housed within the upper wing and is gravity-fed to all four engines. The throttle controls for the engine includes a 'lost motion' mechanism, which uses the first degrees of movement from the idle position to turn on the fuel.

The crew compartment, which was located at the very front of the aircraft, was fully enclosed, then a relatively new and uncommon feature. There were two separate passenger cabins, one forward of the wings and the other aft. The H.P.42E carried six (later 12) in the forward compartment and twelve in the aft. There was also substantial space allocated for storing baggage. The improved H.P.42W variant seated 18 passengers forward and 20 aft, at the cost of a reduced baggage capacity over the preceding model. The cabins featured a high degree of luxury,  having been intentionally styled to resemble Pullman railway carriages akin to the Orient Express; other features intended to increase passenger comfort were a high level of spaciousness, relatively wide windows, and full onboard services. Initially, there were no seatbelts present upon any of the seating until an unrelated air accident motivated Imperial Airways to instate this feature. On the ground, passengers could both embark and egress without using steps or ladders due to the low position of both the doors and the fuselage overall.

Operational history 
On 14 November 1930, the type's maiden flight was conducted by G-AAGX, later to be named Hannibal; it was flown by Squadron Leader Thomas Harold England. During May 1931, the aircraft was granted its certificate of airworthiness, permitting the instatement of commercial services. On 11 June of that year, the first flight with fare-paying passengers was conducted to Paris. Due to the high cost of air travel at this time, typical passengers were usually members of high society, such as royalty, celebrities, and senior business figures; the H.P.42/45 fleet were viewed as the flagships of Imperial Airways and were accordingly provided with prodigious onboard service and an elaborately decorated interior. The type acquired a favourable reputation with the flying public, particularly for their dependability. It would accumulate a combined fleetwide mileage in excess of 10 million miles during a nine year service life with Imperial Airways.

A key demand of Imperial Airways was for its airliners to be able to land safely at low speed, on grass or unpaved airfields, as opposed to the normal runway surface present at almost all airports: this requirement had necessitated the adoption of a large wing area (almost as much as a 767 that weighs more than 10 times as much). During 1951, Peter Masefield wrote, "The trouble about a slow aeroplane with a really low wing loading is the way it insists on wallowing about in turbulent air ... One of the reasons why seven times as many people fly to Paris to-day, compared with 1931, is that the incidence of airsickness in modern aircraft is only one-hundredth of that in the pre-War types." Another writer remembered "I had quite often been landed in a '42' at Lympne to take on sufficient fuel to complete the flight (from Paris) to London against a headwind – 90 mph was its normal cruising speed." However, 90 mph was still three times faster than the previous fastest way of making the journey, which via a combination of steamships and trains. When the H.P.42s were finally withdrawn from civil service on 1 September 1939, they had recorded almost a decade without any major accidents or fatalities.

In 1933, faced with rising demand in conjunction with reduction in capacity owing to accidents, Imperial attempted to purchase two more H.P.42s, to be powered by Armstrong Siddeley Tiger engines, but could not agree a price (Handley Page quoted a price of £42000 each, compared with the average price of £21000 in 1931), so, instead, they ordered two Short Scyllas, landplane versions of the Short Kent flying boat that could be brought into service quickly.

Individual histories 
In total, four H.P.42 and four H.P.45 aircraft were delivered. Two of the HP45s were later converted into HP42s.

H.P.42 

The H.P.42 was intended for the Africa and India services. They were based in Cairo. In June 1939, RAF pilot Eugene Vielle was dispatched to Cairo to fly an H.P.42 back to England. He had to wait until December for spare parts to arrive to get the aircraft into good flying condition. His flight back to RAF Lakenheath, with at intermediate stop at Gibraltar for fuel, was uneventful until he reached the airspace near Lakenheath. As he circled, waiting for other planes in the area to clear the flight path for his landing, his aircraft began to experience engine trouble – possibly due to icing in the engine cowlings due to the frigid winter conditions over Lakenheath – and he was forced to parachute from the aircraft. He landed awkwardly in a sheep farmer's field adjacent the runway, breaking both legs.

G-AAGX Hannibal 
The first flight of the prototype, Hannibal, was on 14 November 1930. The aircraft was named after Hannibal, the Carthaginian military commander. On 8 August 1931, the aircraft was operating a scheduled passenger flight from Croydon to Paris when the port lower engine failed. Flying debris from the failed engine struck the propeller of the port upper engine causing it to vibrate so severely that it had to be shut down. A forced landing was made at Five Oak Green, Kent where the aircraft suffered further damage to a wing and another propeller and the tail was ripped off against a tree stump. There were no injuries amongst the 20 passengers and crew. The aircraft was dismantled and taken to Croydon by road for rebuild. It was lost over the Gulf of Oman on 1 March 1940, with eight aboard, including the First World War ace Group Captain Harold Whistler and the Indian politician Sir A. T. Pannirselvam.  An early report that wreckage of the aircraft had been located, turned out to be incorrect;<ref name=Townsville7Mar1940>"Hannibal Disaster: Wreckage Not Found." Townsville Daily Bulletin (Townsville, QLD), 7 March 1940, p. 4.</ref> no trace of the aircraft, the air mail it carried or its occupants has ever been discovered and the cause of its loss remains unknown.Hobby, R. W. "Imperial Airways HP42 'Hannibal' flight CW197". rrhobby.ca, 2010.
A wrecked H.P.42 had been loaded or unloaded at Haifa/Palestine between 1932 and 1943, according to photographs found in the National Archive of Israel. An H.P.42 was damaged at the RAF temporary landing ground at Semakh on the Sea of Galilee on 17 November 1932, by strong winds. The fuselage and heavily damaged wings were sent by 1.05m gauge Hedjaz Railway to Haifa, where it was transferred to the standard gauge Palestine Railways and forwarded to Heliopolis for repair.

 G-AAUC Horsa 
G-AAUC was originally named for Hecate, the Greek goddess: it was soon renamed for Horsa, the legendary conqueror of Britain and brother of Hengist. The aircraft first flew on 11 September 1931. It was impressed into No. 271 Squadron RAF as AS981. The aircraft burned after a forced landing on uneven ground at Moresby Parks, near Whitehaven, Cumberland, on 7 August 1940.

 G-AAUD Hanno 
G-AAUD, production number 42/3, was named after the Carthaginian explorer Hanno the Navigator, who explored the Atlantic coast of Africa in approx. 570 BC. Hanno first flew on 19 July 1931 and was later converted to a H.P.42(W) (Hannibal class). Hanno suffered a hard landing at Entebbe, but was recovered, refurbished and returned to service. The aircraft was impressed into No. 271 Squadron RAF and was destroyed in a gale at Whitchurch Airport, Bristol, when it was blown together with Heracles and damaged beyond repair on 19 March 1940. This aircraft was featured in the fifteen-minute 1937 Strand Film Company documentary Air Outpost, landing at Al Mahatta  in Sharjah, now in the United Arab Emirates.

 G-AAUE Hadrian 
G-AAUE, production number 42/2, was named after the Roman emperor Hadrian. Hadrian's first flight was on 24 June 1931. On the outbreak of the Second World War, Hadrian was impressed into No. 261 Squadron RAF as AS982, at RAF Odiham. On 6 December 1940, Hadrian was torn loose from its moorings at Doncaster Airport in a gale, cartwheeled, and ended up inverted on a railway track next to the airport. The aircraft was too badly damaged to be worth repairing. The aircraft made a brief appearance in the 1936 movie Song of Freedom starring Paul Robeson.

 H.P.45 
The H.P.45 carried more passengers with a reduced range and baggage capacity, and was intended for Imperial Airways' European routes.

 G-AAXC Heracles 

G-AAXC was named after Heracles, also known as Hercules, a figure from Greek mythology who was the son of Zeus and Alcmene and was noted for his extraordinary strength. On 8 August 1931, Heracles took its first flight. It was most commonly deployed on the airline's services between Paris, Cologne, and Zurich; on 23 July 1937, the aircraft was recorded as having accumulated one million miles servicing the aforementioned routes. Heracles was impressed into service with the RAF on 3 March 1940. The aircraft was destroyed in a gale on 19 March 1940 at Whitchurch Airport, Bristol, when it was blown together with Hanno and damaged beyond repair.

 G-AAXD Horatius 
G-AAXD was named after Horatius, a legendary Roman hero. Horatius first flew on 6 November 1931. On 9 December 1937, Horatius was struck by lightning whilst flying across the Channel from Paris to Croydon. A precautionary landing was made at Lympne where it was found that minor damage had been done to a wing. In September 1938, Horatius suffered damage to its port undercarriage and lower port wing in a forced landing at Lympne. The aircraft was repaired and returned to service. It was impressed into RAF service in the Second World War. Returning from France on a transport mission on 7 November 1939, the aircraft could not find its destination of Exeter due to bad weather and was forced to make an emergency landing at Tiverton Golf Course; during which, it hit two trees and was destroyed. A four-bladed wooden propeller from the aircraft was salvaged and is now on display at the Croydon Airport Visitor Centre, situated in the former terminal building of Croydon Airport.Horatius can briefly be seen in action in the film Air Outpost and the 1937 film Stolen Holiday.

 G-AAXE Hengist 

G-AAXE was originally named for the Hesperides, but was soon renamed after Hengist, brother of Horsa and legendary conqueror of Britain. Hengist first flew on 8 December 1931. It was later converted from a European to an Eastern aircraft. Hengist was caught in an airship hangar fire and burned at Karachi, India on 31 May 1937, making it the only H.P.42/45 not to survive until the Second World War.

 G-AAXF Helena 
G-AAXF was named after Helena (Helen of Troy). It first flew on 30 December 1931. Like Hengist, it was converted to an Eastern aircraft. Helena was impressed into service with No. 271 Squadron RAF in May 1940. After a hard landing, the aircraft was grounded later that year; post-accident inspection condemned the airframe due to corrosion, and it was scrapped in 1941, except for the front fuselage section which was used as an office by the Royal Navy for several years. Parts of this plane can be seen in the 1933 film The Solitaire Man.

 Operators 

Imperial Airways
Royal Air Force
 No. 271 Squadron RAF

 Specifications (H.P.42E) 

 Notable appearances in media 

The H.P.42 features in Roy Lockwood's 1934 short documentary film Airport (a "day-in-the-life" of London's Croydon Airport).
G-AAXE Hengist is scene of the murder in the 1934 mystery novel The 12.30 from Croydon by Freeman Wills Crofts.
The H.P.42 features as a crime scene in Agatha Christie's 1935 novel Death In The Clouds.
An H.P.42 briefly appears near the beginning of the animated film Kiki's Delivery Service by Studio Ghibli.
A fictional fifth H.P.42 G-AAXJ "Horus" is prominently featured in Roger Leloup's comic series Yoko Tsuno, in the albums Message pour l'éternité and Anges et faucons.
H.P.45 G-AAXD "Horatius" appears in the 1937 film "Stolen Holiday".

 See also 

 References 

 Citations 

 Bibliography 

 Banks, Francis Rodwell. I kept no diary: 60 Years with Marine Diesels, Automobile and Aero engines. London: Airlife Publications, 1978. .
 Barnes, C. H. Handley Page Aircraft since 1907. London: Putnam, 1976. .
 Barnes, C. H. Handley Page Aircraft Since 1907. London: Putnam & Company, Ltd., 1987. .
 Barnes, C. H. Shorts Aircraft since 1902. London: Putnam, 1967.
 Eleanor, Mary., Beggs Humphreys and D. W. Humphreys. The Scientific and Industrial Revolution of Our Time. Taylor & Francis, 2005. .
 Clayton, Donald C. Handley Page, an Aircraft Album. Shepperton, Surrey, UK: Ian Allan Ltd., 1969. .
 Cooke, David Coxe. Transport Planes that Made History. London: Putnam, 1959.
 Jackson, Aubrey Joseph. British Civil Aircraft since 1919. London: Putnam, Second edition, 1973. .
 Jackson, Aubrey Joseph. British Civil Aircraft, 1919–1972, Volume 2. London: Putnam, 1988. .
 Swanborough, Gordon. "H.P. 42: First of the million milers". Air International, Vol. 42, No. 3, March 1992, pp. 139–144. ISSN 0306-5634.
 Sweetman, William. A History of Passenger Aircraft. Hamlyn, 1979. .
 Taylor, Michael John Haddrick and John William Ransom Taylor. Encyclopedia of Aircraft. Putnam, 1978.
 "The Handley Page type 42 commercial airplane (British): a metal sesquiplane." National Advisory Committee for Aeronautics, 1 December 1930. NACA-AC-131, 93R19549.
 Votolato, Gregory. Transport Design: A Travel History. Reaktion Books, 2007. .
 Woodley, Charles. The History of British European Airways.'' Casemate Publishers, 2006. .

External links 

 "Forty Passenger Airplane Use On European Airways", Popular Mechanics, February 1931
 "Color Cover Illustration of H.P.42", Popular Mechanics, March 1931
 "The World's Largest Airliner..." Popular Mechanics, Cutaway March 1931, drawing on pp. 394–395
 "Giant British Airliner." British Pathé newsreel via the Smithsonian

1930s British airliners
H.P.042
Four-engined tractor aircraft
Aircraft first flown in 1930
Biplanes
Four-engined piston aircraft